XHPLVI-FM is a radio station on 99.7 FM in Calvillo, Aguascalientes. It is owned by Grupo Ultra and carries its Radio Ranchito ranchera format.

History
XHPLVI was awarded in the IFT-4 radio auction of 2017 and came to air in May 2018.

References

External links
Radio Ranchito 99.7 Facebook

Radio stations in Aguascalientes
Radio stations established in 2018
2018 establishments in Mexico